Juhel is a French masculine given name derived from Judicael. It may refer to:

 Juhel of Totnes
 Juhel de Mayenne
Juhel I de Mayenne
Juhel II de Mayenne
Juhel III de Mayenne

See also
 Judicael, a variant of the name